The beta-silicon effect also called silicon hyperconjugation in organosilicon chemistry is a special type of hyperconjugation that describes the stabilizing influence of a silicon atom on the development of positive charge at a carbon atom one position removed (β) from the silicon atom. The C-Si σ orbital is said to partially overlap with the σ* anti-bonding orbital of the C-leaving group, lowering the energy of the transition state leading to the formation of a carbocation.  A prerequisite for the hyperconjugation to occur is an antiperiplanar relationship between the Si group and the leaving group. This allows for the maximum overlap between the C-Si σ orbital and the σ* anti-bonding orbital of the leaving group. Silicon hyperconjugation explains specific observations regarding chemical kinetics and stereochemistry of organic reactions with reactants containing silicon.

The picture below shows the partial overlap of the C-Si σ orbital with the C-X (leaving group) σ*orbital(2b). This donation of electron density into the anti-bonding orbital weakens the C-X bonding orbital, lowering the energy barrier to breakage of the C-X bond as indicated in transition state 3. This stabilization of the transition state leads to favorable formation of carbenium ion 4. This becomes manifest in the increased rates of reactions that have positive charge developing on carbon atoms β to the silicon.

The alpha-silicon effect is the destabilizing effect a silicon atom has on the development of positive charge on a carbon atom α to the silicon (ie directly attached to the silicon). As a corollary to this, development of negative charge on this atom is stabilized, as seen in the increased rates of reactions that develop negative charge here, such as metalations. This is explained by partial overlap of the C-M σ orbital with the C-Si σ* anti-bonding orbital, which stabilizes the C-M bond.

In a pioneering study by Frank C. Whitmore ethyltrichlorosilane (scheme 2) was chlorinated by sulfuryl chloride as chlorine donor and benzoyl peroxide as radical initiator in a radical substitution resulting in chloride monosubstitution to some extent in the α-position (28%, due to steric hindrance of the silyl group) and predominantly in the β-position.

By adding sodium hydroxide to the α-substituted compound only the silicon chlorine groups are replaced but not the carbon chlorine group. Addition of alkali to the β-substituted compound on the other hand leads to an elimination reaction with liberation of ethylene.

In another set of experiments (scheme 3) the chlorination is repeated with n-propyltrichlorosilane The α-adduct and the γ-adduct are resistant to hydrolysis but the chlorine group in the β-adduct gets replaced by a hydroxyl group.

The silicon effect is also manifest in certain compound properties. Trimethylsilylmethylamine (Me3SiCH2NH2) is a stronger base with a pKa of 10.96 for the conjugate acid than the carbon analogue neopentyl amine with pKa 10.21. In the same vein trimethylsilylacetic acid (pKa 5.22) is a poorer acid than trimethyl acetic acid (pKa 5.00).

References 

Physical organic chemistry